The Batrachomyomachia (from , "frog", "mouse", and , "battle") or Battle of the Frogs and Mice is a comic epic, or a parody of the Iliad, commonly attributed to Homer, although other authors have been proposed.

The word batrachomyomachia has come to mean "a trivial altercation". Both the Greek word and its German translation, Froschmäusekrieg, have been used to describe disputes such as the one between the ideologues and pragmatists in the Reagan administration.

Plot
Psycharpax, the Mouse-Prince, having escaped a hunting cat, stops by the shore of a lake to drink, and encounters the Frog King Physignathus.  Physignathus offers to show Psycharpax his kingdom, on the other side of the lake, and the Mouse agrees.  Psycharpax climbs onto the Frog King's back, and Physignathus begins to swim across the lake.  In the middle of the lake, they are confronted by a frightening water snake.  Physignathus dives, forgetting about Psycharpax, who cannot swim, and drowns.

On the bank, another Mouse witnesses Psycharpax' death, and informs the other Mice, who arm themselves for battle to avenge the Frog King's treachery, and send a herald to the Frogs with a declaration of war.  The Frogs blame their King, who altogether denies the incident.  In the meantime, Zeus, seeing the brewing war, proposes that the gods take sides, and specifically that Athena help the Mice. Athena refuses, saying that Mice have done her a lot of mischief.  Eventually the gods decide to watch rather than get involved.  A battle ensues, and the Mice prevail.  Zeus summons a force of crabs to prevent the complete destruction of the Frogs.  Powerless against the armoured crabs, the Mice retreat, and the one-day war ends at sundown.

Authorship

The Romans attributed the Batrachomyomachia to Homer, but according to Plutarch, it is the work of Pigres of Halicarnassus, either the brother or son of Artemisia I, the Queen of Caria, and an ally of Xerxes. Some modern scholars attribute the poem to an anonymous author who would have lived at the time of Alexander the Great, although other authors have been proposed, such as Lucian.

References

English translations
Chapman, George (trans.) Homer's Batrachomyomachia, Hymns and Epigrams. Adamant Media Corporation, 2001. 
Hine, Daryl (trans.) The Battle of the Frogs and the Mice, Works of Hesiod and the Homeric Hymns. University of Chicago Press, 2008. 
Stallings, A. E. (trans.) The Battle Between the Frogs and the Mice: a tiny homeric epic. Philadelphia: Paul Dry Books, 2019. 
Hosty, M. (trans.) Batrachomyomachia (Battle of the Frogs and Mice): Introduction, Text, Translation, and Commentary. Oxford: Oxford University Press, 2020.

External links

 The Batrachomyomachia at the Ex-Classics Website; Translated by Jane Barlow with Decorations by decorations by Francis D. Bedford
 Archive.org - Homer's Batrachomyomachia : hymns and epigrams, translated by George Chapman.
 Wiegran.de - Batrachomyomachia
 Βατραχομυομαχία - Greek text
 

Ancient Greek mock-heroic poems
War in mythology
Homer
Poetry based on the Iliad
Fictional frogs
Mice and rats in literature